Peritrox insulatus is a species of beetle in the family Cerambycidae. It was described by Rodrigues and Mermudes in 2011.

References

Onciderini
Beetles described in 2011